Gunnar Soderberg (born 1896) was a Swedish labour activist. He was the founder of the Unemployed Workers' Organisation in London in 1923.

References

Industrial Workers of the World members
1896 births
Year of death missing